Bouts-Rimés (French, literally 'rhymed-ends') is the name given to a kind of poetic game defined by Addison in the Spectator as "lists of words that rhyme to one another, drawn up by another hand, and given to a poet, who was to make a poem to the rhymes in the same order that they were placed upon the list".

The more odd and perplexing the rhymes are, the more ingenuity is required to give a semblance of common sense to the production. For instance, the rhyme scheme breeze, elephant, squeeze, pant, scant, please, hope, pope is submitted, and the following stanza is the result:

The invention of bouts-rimés is attributed to a minor French poet of the 17th century named Dulot, of whom little else is remembered. According to the Menagiana, about the year 1648, Dulot was complaining one day that he had been robbed of a number of valuable papers, and, in particular, of three hundred sonnets. Surprise being expressed at his having written so many, Dulot explained that they were all blank sonnets, that is to say, that he had put down the rhymes and nothing else. The idea struck everyone as amusing, and what Dulot had done seriously was taken up as a jest. Bouts-rimés became the fashion, and in 1654 Jean François Sarrazin composed a satire against them, entitled La Défaite des bouts-rimés ('The defeat of the rhymed-ends'), which enjoyed a great success. Nevertheless, they continued to be abundantly composed in France throughout the 17th century and a great part of the 18th century.

The Academy of Toulouse have also contributed towards keeping in countenance the bouts-rimés, by holding an annual contest , to describe the glories of Louis XIV of France; the victorious sonnet was rewarded with a medal. An instance of this is the following one, filled out by Father Commire:

{|
|Tout est grand dans le Roi, l'Aspect seul de son
|buste
|Everything is big about the king, just the looks of his bust
|-
|Rend nos fiers Ennemis plus froids que des
|Glacons :
| turn our fierce enemies colder than ice
|-
|Et Guillaume n'attend que le Tems des
|Moissons,
| and William can't wait for the time of [Moissons],
|-
|Pour se voir Soccomber sous un bras si
|robuste.
|to see himself succumb under so robust an arm.
|-
|Qu'on ne nous vante plus les Miracles d'''
|Auguste;
| Let nobody praise the miracles of August to use anymore;
|-
|Louis de bien regnir lui feroit des|Lecons :
|Louis [feroit] him the lessons of good ruling:
|-
|Horace en vain l'egale aux Dieux dans ses|Chansons.
|Horace vainly compares him to the gods in his songs.
|-
|Moins que mon Heros il etoit sage et|juste, etc.
| Less than my hero, he was wise and just, etc.
|-
|}

In 1701 Etienne Mallemans (d. 1716) published a collection of serious sonnets, all written to rhymes selected for him by the duchess of Maine. Neither Piron, nor Marmontel, nor La Motte disdained this ingenious exercise, and early in the 19th century the fashion was revived. The most curious incident, however, in the history of bouts-rimés is the fact that the elder Alexandre Dumas, in 1864, took them under his protection. He issued an invitation to all the poets of France to display their skill by composing to sets of rhymes selected for the purpose by the poet, Joseph Méry (1798-1866). No fewer than 350 writers responded to the appeal, and Dumas published the result, as a volume, in 1865.

W. M. Rossetti, in the memoir of his brother prefixed to Dante Gabriel Rossetti's Collected Works (1886), mentions that, especially in 1848 and 1849, he and Rossetti constantly practised their pens in writing sonnets to bouts-rimés, each giving the other the rhymes for a sonnet, and Dante Gabriel writing off these exercises in verse-making at the rate of a sonnet in five or eight minutes. Most of W. M. Rossetti's poems in The Germ were bouts-rimés experiments. Many of Dante Gabriel's, a little touched-up, remained in his brother's possession, but were not included in the Collected Works''.  Their sister, Christina Rossetti, was considered particularly good.  Dante prized the following sonnet she had composed in this fashion:

Notes

References

External links
Play Bouts-Rimés online

Word games
Poetic forms
1640s in France
1640s introductions
1640s in literature
French inventions